Basilica of Saint Neophytos is the name of a defunct, underwater basilica in Lake Iznik, modern-day Turkey.

History
In 2014 the underwater Byzantine Basilica of Saint Neophytos, dedicated to Saint Neophytos, was discovered in Lake Iznik, modern-day Turkey. The basilica had been built in the place where he was killed on the shore of the lake and subsequently became submerged after an earthquake AD740.

It is possible, according to researchers, that the basilica was built as a result of the First Council of Nicaea, convened by Emperor Constantine the Great in the year 325.

Its discovery was included in the list of top 10 archaeological discoveries of 2014 released by Archaeological Institute of America.

References

Byzantine church buildings in Turkey
History of Bursa Province
Lakes of Turkey
Underwater ruins
Byzantine Bithynia